Godfather-in-law is a documentary book written by Rakhat Aliyev, former son-in-law of the President of Kazakhstan Nursultan Nazarbayev. In his book, Aliyev gives a deep insight into the corrupt, criminal activities of the autocratic system in Kazakhstan, including secrets and the system of governance of Nursultan Nazarbayev. The book Godfather-in-law was published in German and English languages. There is a criminal liability in Kazakhstan for distributing and using the book.

References
 https://sites.google.com/site/komromatkz/kniga
 http://rus.azattyq.org/content/Krestny_test_Rakhat_Aliev/1663602.html
 http://rakhataliev.livejournal.com/
 http://www.wienerzeitung.at/default.aspx?tabID=3948&alias=wzo&cob=426394
 http://www.zakon.kz/58573-za-rasprostranenie-i-ispolzovanie-knigi.html 

Politics of Kazakhstan